Oxyfedrine is a vasodilator and a β adrenoreceptor agonist. It was found to depress the tonicity of coronary vessels, improve myocardial metabolism (so that heart can sustain hypoxia better) and also exert a positive chronotropic and inotropic effects, thereby not precipitating angina pectoris. The latter property (positive chronotropic and inotropic effects) is particularly important, because other vasodilators used in angina may be counter productive causing coronary steal phenomenon. 

Synergistic effects with antibiotics have been suggested.

Synthesis

Mannich condensation of PPA [14838-15-4] (1) with formaldehyde and m-acetanisole (3-Acetylanisole) [586-37-8] (2) yields oxyfedrine (3).

References 

Vasodilators
Phenol ethers
Phenylethanolamines
Substituted amphetamines
Aromatic ketones